Rahal Rural District is in the Central District of Khoy County, West Azerbaijan province, Iran. At the National Census of 2006, its population was 16,190 in 3,500 households. There were 16,897 inhabitants in 4,574 households at the following census of 2011. At the most recent census of 2016, the population of the rural district was 16,620 in 4,669 households. The largest of its 53 villages was Yazdekan, with 2,437 people.

References 

Khoy County

Rural Districts of West Azerbaijan Province

Populated places in West Azerbaijan Province

Populated places in Khoy County